Wilson Beach is a coastal locality in the Whitsunday Region, Queensland, Australia.

Geography
The estuary of the Proserpine River, where it enters the Coral Sea, forms the southern boundary.

References 

Whitsunday Region
Localities in Queensland